Identification tag may refer to:
 Dog tag, an identification tag used by the military
 Microchip implant (animal) or radio identification tag, a scanner-readable microchip implanted into livestock and pets for identification
 Pet tag, a small flat tag worn on pets' collars or harnesses
 Toe tag, identification tag used on the big toe of a dead person in a morgue
 Personal badge